NLL may refer to:

Sports 
Two unrelated lacrosse leagues by the name of National Lacrosse League:
National Lacrosse League, an ongoing league formed in 1987
National Lacrosse League (1974–75), a defunct league formed in 1974
Northern Lakes League, a Northwest Ohio High School athletic conference
Nación Lucha Libre, a Mexican professional wrestling promotion

Politics 

Northern Limit Line, a disputed maritime boundary between North and South Korea
National Liberation League in Palestine, a defunct political party in Palestine

Institutions 
New Line Learning Academy, a school in Loose, England
The National Library of Latvia
Foundation NLL, a former name of the Royal Netherlands Aerospace Centre

Transportation 

 The North London Line, a railway line in London, England